WRHN (100.1 FM, "Jack FM") is a radio station broadcasting an adult hits music format. Licensed to Rhinelander, Wisconsin, United States, the station is currently owned by NRG Media and features programming from Fox News Radio. Formerly, Star 100 and most recently 100.1 Sam FM. The programming is derived from Westwood One's "Jack FM" moniker.

Previous logos

References

External links

RHN
Oneida County, Wisconsin
NRG Media radio stations
Jack FM stations
Adult hits radio stations in the United States